Kautenbach is a village in the commune of Kiischpelt, in northern Luxembourg.  In 2005, the village had a population of 120.

Kautenbach was a commune in the canton of Wiltz until January 1, 2006, when it was merged with the commune of Wilwerwiltz to form the new commune of Kiischpelt.  The law creating Kiischpelt was passed on 14 July 2005.

Until 17 April 1914, the commune was known as 'Alscheid', after its former administrative centre.  On that date, the administrative centre was moved from Alscheid to Kautenbach.

The ancient Schuttbourg Castle is located near the Village of Kautenbach.

Former commune
The former commune consisted of the villages:

 Alscheid
 Kautenbach
 Merkholz
 Koenerhof (lieu-dit)
 Schuttbourg-Château (lieu-dit)
 Schuttbourg-Moulin (lieu-dit)

Footnotes

Kiischpelt
Former communes of Luxembourg
Villages in Luxembourg